Adam Cyra (born 1949) is a Polish historian. A specialist in World War II history of Central Europe, he graduated from Jagiellonian University. Since 1972 he is a staff member of the Auschwitz-Birkenau State Museum in Oświęcim. His doctoral thesis at the Silesian University was on a Polish cavalry officer, intelligence agent, and resistance leader Witold Pilecki. He authored several dozen books and articles, mostly on World War II history of Poland and the Auschwitz concentration camp.

Selected works 
 Adam Cyra, Raport Witolda, „Biuletyn Towarzystwa Opieki nad Oświęcimiem” 1991 nr 12.
 Adam Cyra, Sylwetki niektórych żołnierzy AK – członków obozowego i przyobozowego ruchu oporu. Uroczystość odsłonięcia i poświęcenia pamiątkowej tablicy w hołdzie żołnierzom  Armii Krajowej i ludziom niosącym pomoc więźniom Oświęcimia, Katowice 1995.
 Adam Cyra, Wiesław J. Wysocki, Rotmistrz Witold Pilecki, Warszawa 1997. 
 Adam Cyra, Ochotnik do Auschwitz. Witold Pilecki (1901-1948), Oświęcim 2000 , 
 Adam Cyra, Cichociemny z Babic. Major Piotr Szewczyk (1908-1988), Oświęcim 2000, Warszawa 2006, Oświęcim - Tułowice 2016.  
 Adam Cyra, Pozostał po nich ślad...życiorysy z cel śmierci, Oświęcim 2006. 
 Adam Cyra, Mieszkańcy ziemi olkuskiej w hitlerowskich więzieniach i obozach koncentracyjnych, Oświęcim – Olkusz 2005. 
 Adam Cyra, Spadochroniarz „Urban”. Ppor. Stefan Jasieński (1914-1945), Oświęcim 2005. 
 Adam Cyra, Upamiętnienie Żydów olkuskich. 65. rocznica likwidacji getta w Olkuszu – czerwiec 2007 r., Oświęcim – Olkusz 2007. ISSN 0860-4258
 Adam Cyra, Podobóz KL Auschwitz Harmęże, Oświęcim 2007. ISBN 978-83- 60367-64-3
 Adam Cyra, Banderowcy w KL Auschwitz, (in:) „Studia nad Faszyzmem i Zbrodniami Hitlerowskimi”, t. XXX, Wrocław 2008.
 Adam Cyra, Żwirownia obok Theatergebäude jako miejsce zbrodni w KL Auschwitz, (w:) „Studia nad Faszyzmem i Zbrodniami Hitlerowskimi”, t. XXXIV, Wrocław 2012.

References

External links 
 Adam Cyra's blog

1949 births
Living people
21st-century Polish historians
Polish male non-fiction writers
20th-century Polish historians